is the third single by the Japanese girl idol group Keyakizaka46. It was released in Japan on 30 November 2016 on the label Sony Records.

The center position in the choreography for the title song is held by Yurina Hirate.

The single was number-one on the Oricon Weekly Singles Chart, with 442,000 copies sold in the first week. As a female group debuted within a year, they broke over 400,000 sales record for the first time in 20 years and became the second group in the history following Puffy. It was also number-one on the Billboard Japan Hot 100.

Release 
It was released in 4 editions, Type-A, Type-B, Type-C and a regular edition. All editions, except the regular edition, include a DVD with music videos.

Music video 
The choreography for the title song was instructed by Takahiro Ueno. The music video was directed by Ryōhei Shingū. It was taken in a suburb of Tokyo for two days.

Track listings 
All lyrics written by Yasushi Akimoto.

Type-A

Type-B

Type-C

Regular Edition

Members

"Futari Saison" 
Center: Yurina Hirate
 1st row: Fuyuka Saitō, Shiori Satō, Minami Koike, Yurina Hirate, Aoi Harada, Miyu Suzumoto, Akane Moriya
 2nd row: Yui Imaizumi, Yūka Sugai, Rika Watanabe, Neru Nagahama, Risa Watanabe, Manaka Shida, Yui Kobayashi
 3rd row: Nana Oda, Rika Ozeki, Nanako Nagasawa, Rina Uemura, Nanami Yonetani, Nijika Ishimori, Mizuho Habu

"Otona wa Shinjite Kurenai" 
 Nijika Ishimori, Yui Imaizumi, Rina Uemura, Rika Ozeki, Nana Oda, Minami Koike, Yui Kobayashi, Fuyuka Saitō, Shiori Satō, Manaka Shida, Yūka Sugai, Miyu Suzumoto, Nanako Nagasawa, Neru Nagahama, Mizuho Habu, Aoi Harada, Yurina Hirate, Akane Moriya, Nanami Yonetani, Rika Watanabe, Risa Watanabe

"Seifuku to Taiyō" 
 Nijika Ishimori, Yui Imaizumi, Rina Uemura, Rika Ozeki, Nana Oda, Minami Koike, Yui Kobayashi, Fuyuka Saitō, Shiori Satō, Manaka Shida, Yūka Sugai, Miyu Suzumoto, Nanako Nagasawa, Neru Nagahama, Mizuho Habu, Aoi Harada, Yurina Hirate, Akane Moriya, Nanami Yonetani, Rika Watanabe, Risa Watanabe

"Dare Yori mo Takaku Tobe!" 
Sung by Hiragana Keyakizaka46(Undergroup) members.

 Mao Iguchi, Sarina Ushio, Memi Kakizaki, Yūka Kageyama, Shiho Katō, Kyōko Saitō, Kumi Sasaki, Mirei Sasaki, Mana Takase, Ayaka Takamoto, Neru Nagahama, Mei Higashimura

"Bokutachi no Sensou" 
Sung by the unit Five Cards consists of the following members.

 Rina Uemura, Nanako Nagasawa, Mizuho Habu, Rika Watanabe, Risa Watanabe

"Yūhi 1/3" 
Sung by the unit Techi Neru Yui-chanzu consists of the following members.

 Yui Imaizumi, Yui Kobayashi, Neru Nagahama, Yurina Hirate

Chart and certifications

Weekly charts

Year-end charts

Certifications

References

Further reading

External links 
 Discography on the official website of Keyakizaka46
 

Keyakizaka46 songs
2016 singles
2016 songs
Songs with lyrics by Yasushi Akimoto
Sony Music Entertainment Japan singles
Oricon Weekly number-one singles
Billboard Japan Hot 100 number-one singles